Paper density is a paper product's mass per unit volume.  The density can be calculated by dividing the grammage of paper (in grams per square metre or "gsm") by its caliper (usually in micrometres, occasionally in mils).

The "ISO 534:2011, Paper and board — Determination of thickness, density and specific volume" indicates that the paper density is expressed in grams per cubic centimeter (g/cm3).

See also
 Grammage
 Density
 Area density
 Linear density

References

External links
 Paper Weight – Conversion Chart
 Understanding Paper Weights
 Understanding paper weight (Staples, Inc.)
 M-weight Calculator
 Paper Weight Calculator

Paper
Printing